Blanche Amblard was a French tennis player. Amblard regularly played doubles with her twin sister Suzanne. They won the French Championships in back-to-back years in 1913 and 1914. They also finished runner-up at the World Hard Court Championships in 1914 to Suzanne Lenglen and Elizabeth Ryan. In singles, Amblard reached the semifinals of the World Hard Court Championships in 1913. She was ranked as the seventh best French women's tennis player in 1921, while her sister was fourth.

References

French female tennis players
French Championships (tennis) champions
Twin sportspeople
Year of birth missing
Year of death missing